Orpheum is a name often used for theatres or other entertainment venues.  It may refer to:

Theatres
Orpheum Circuit, a chain of vaudeville and movie theaters

Canada
Orpheum (Vancouver), Vancouver, British Columbia, Canada

Germany
Orpheum Dresden

Malta
Orpheum Theatre (Malta)

United States
Orpheum Theater (Flagstaff, Arizona)
Orpheum Theatre (Phoenix, Arizona)
Orpheum Theatre (Los Angeles), California
Orpheum Theatre (San Francisco), California
Orpheum Theatre (Champaign, Illinois)
Orpheum Theater (Galesburg) Illinois 
Hotel Mississippi-RKO Orpheum Theater, Davenport, Iowa
Orpheum Theatre (Sioux City, Iowa)
Orpheum Theatre (Wichita, Kansas)
Orpheum Theater (New Orleans)
Orpheum Theatre (Boston), Massachusetts
Orpheum Theatre (New Bedford, Massachusetts)
NorShor Theatre or Orpheum Theatre, Duluth, Minnesota
Orpheum Theatre (Minneapolis), Minnesota
Orpheum Theater (St. Louis), St. Louis, Missouri
Orpheum Theatre (Omaha), Omaha, Nebraska
Orpheum Theatre (Manhattan), New York, New York
Orpheum Theater (Sioux Falls), South Dakota
Orpheum Theatre (Memphis), Tennessee
Orpheum Theatre (Madison, Wisconsin)

Other uses
Orpheum Children's Science Museum, a museum in Champaign, Illinois
Orpheum Foundation for the Advancement of Young Soloists, a Swiss foundation
The Orpheum, a surgical building at the Jersey City Medical Center

See also
 Orpheus (disambiguation)

Lists of theatres